Yuri Gagarin State Technical University of Saratov (SSTU, Russian: Саратовский государственный технический университет имени Гагарина Ю.А.) was founded in 1930 as Saratov Automobile and Road Institute. It was renamed in 2011 to honour astronaut Yuri Gagarin. SSTU offers Bachelor, Master, and PhD studies in more than 115 fields.

History
1930- Foundation of the Saratov Automobile and Road Institute.

1960- Saratov Polytechnic Institute.

1992 Saratov State Technical University.

2011 - Yuri Gagarin State Technical University of Saratov.

2017 - SSTU became the Flagship University of Saratov region.

Institutes
 Institute of Electronic Engineering and Instrumentation
 Institute of Mechanical Engineering and Materials Science
 Institute of Physics and Technology
 Institute of Applied Information Technologies and Communication
 Institute of Power Engineering & Transport Systems
 Institute of Urban Planning, Architecture & Civil Engineering
 Institute of Social and Industrial Management
 Social and Economic Institute
 Engels Institute of Technology (branch)
 Institute of Continuing and Pre-University Education

Secondary vocational education
 Professional Training College 
 Saratov College of Machine Building & Power Engineering 
 Petrovsk College of Yuri Gagarin State Technical University of Saratov (Branch in the Petrovsk town)

Russian language school
In SSTU foreign applicants are taught the Russian language for admission to the bachelor's and master's degree programs. There are three study programs:

 Russian language (preparatory course) - 9 months
 Russian summer language school- 1 month
 Russian on-line language school - 1 month

References

External links
 Official site of the Yuri Gagarin State Technical University of Saratov (English version)
 Official site of the Yuri Gagarin State Technical University of Saratov
 Official site of the international education center SGTU

Buildings and structures in Saratov
Universities in Volga Region
Buildings and structures in Saratov Oblast
Technical universities and colleges in Russia
Education in Saratov